The Moldova national badminton team represents Moldova in international badminton team competitions. It is controlled by the Badminton Federation of the Republic of Moldova (BFRM). The Moldovan badminton team made their debut in the BWF World Junior Championships in 2016 and finished in 50th place.

The Moldovan team are ranked 75th in the world team ranking.

Participation in European Team Badminton Championships
The Moldovan team failed to qualify for the 2019 European Mixed Team Badminton Championships after losing the qualification tie to Scotland, Ukraine and Russia.
Mixed Team

Participation in European Junior Team Badminton Championships
Mixed Team

Current squad 

Male players
Vladimir Leadavschi
Vitalie Izbaş
Piotr Cunev
Cristian Savin
Igor Uscov

Female players
Vlada Ginga
Anna Cernetchi
Elena-Alexandra Diordiev
Paola Ginga
Fedotcenco Ecaterina

References

Badminton
National badminton teams
Badminton in Moldova